Chukanlu (also Romanized as Chūkānlū) is a village in Shah Jahan Rural District, in the Central District of Faruj County, North Khorasan Province, Iran. At the 2006 census, its population was 1,683, in 405 families.

References 

Populated places in Faruj County